In due is the fifth studio album by Italian singer-songwriter Nek. It was released on 5 June 1998. Since 1999 are reported sales of over one million copies all over the world.

Track listing

Charts and certifications

Weekly charts

Certifications

Reception
AllMusic

References

1998 albums
Nek albums